Elaine J. Morgan is an American politician and a Republican member of the Rhode Island Senate representing District 34 since January 2015. She is the Senate minority whip. She was the first female elected to be a Hopkinton town sergeant, serving for three terms before her election.

Personal life 
She is married to Edward. They have two children, Samantha and Ian.

References 

Date of birth missing (living people)
Living people
People from Hopkinton, Rhode Island
Republican Party Rhode Island state senators
Women state legislators in Rhode Island
21st-century American politicians
21st-century American women politicians
Year of birth missing (living people)